James Reginald Franks (November 8, 1914 — February 12, 1994) was a Canadian ice hockey goaltender who played in the National Hockey League between 1937 and 1944 with the Detroit Red Wings, New York Rangers, and Boston Bruins.

Early life 
Franks was born in Melville, Saskatchewan. He played minor league hockey with the Pittsburgh Hornets.

Career
Franks began his National Hockey League career with the Detroit Red Wings in 1937. He would also play with the New York Rangers and Boston Bruins. He retired after the 1943–44 season. Franks won a Stanley Cup with the 1937 Red Wings playing one playoff game due to Normie Smith being injured.

He also played several years in different minor leagues, mainly the American Hockey League, and retired in 1945.

Career statistics

Regular season and playoffs

External links
 

1914 births
1994 deaths
Boston Bruins players
Buffalo Bisons (AHL) players
Canadian ice hockey goaltenders
Detroit Red Wings players
Ice hockey people from Saskatchewan
Indianapolis Capitals players
Kansas City Greyhounds players
New York Rangers players
Omaha Knights (AHA) players
Sportspeople from Melville, Saskatchewan
Pittsburgh Hornets players
St. Louis Flyers players
Stanley Cup champions
Syracuse Stars (AHL) players
Canadian expatriate ice hockey players in the United States

References